is a passenger railway station located in the city of Sukumo, Kōchi Prefecture, Japan. It is operated by the third-sector Tosa Kuroshio Railway and has the station number "TK44".

Lines and Trains
Only local trains stop at the station.

Layout
The station consists of a side platform serving a single track set in a cutting. There is no station building, but an enclosed shelter is provided on the platform for waiting passengers. The access road leads to the top of the cutting from where a flight of steps leads down to the platform. Bike sheds are provided at the top of the stairs.

Adjacent stations

History

Passenger statistics
In fiscal 2011, the station was used by an average of 42 passengers daily.

Surrounding area
Nakasuji River
Sukumo Industrial Park
Kochi Prefectural Sukumo Technical High School
Sukumo Municipal Higashi Junior High School

See also
 List of railway stations in Japan

References

External links
Station timetable

Railway stations in Kōchi Prefecture
Railway stations in Japan opened in 1997
Sukumo, Kōchi